The following is a complete list of episodes from the ABS-CBN primetime drama series Maging Sino Ka Man.

The pilot episode, which introduced the main characters of the TV series, aired as a 1.5 hour special on October 6, 2006. Regular primetime broadcast began three days later on October 9.

A total of 164 episodes aired in this series. The final episode was aired on May 25, 2007. This list is ordered by the original airdates in the Philippines.

Series overview
 Special pilot episode

Episodes

All airdates for each episode are those from the Philippines.

Special pilot episode

In the 1.5 hour special pilot episode, the main characters (Eli, Jackie, Celine, and JB) are introduced, and the terrible crime that will forever change their lives takes place.

Week 1

In this week's episodes, the Madrigal, Magsaysay, and Berenguer families mistakenly believe that Jackie is dead. Eli hides Jackie in one of the provincial towns, while Pong tries to convince Dadoods to move away. Jackie awakens at last with no memory of what happened, and her efforts to be the 'perfect wife' lead to several uncomfortable moments for Eli. JB's attempt to find peace and serenity backfires when he and Celine end up marooned together.

Week 2

In this week's episodes, Eli battles with guilt and temptation while Jackie deals with the harsh realities of a poor, provincial life. Jackie still has many questions about her forgotten past, but she is determined to be a perfect wife to Eli. JB sees Celine in a whole new light after being marooned on an island with her. Celine resolves to move on after admitting to herself that she can't compete with Jackie's memory for JB's love, but it seems JB has new ideas of his own. Aling Bebeng's search for her own daughter brings Jackie to Manila, where Celine sees her.

Week 3

In this week's episodes, Celine sees Jackie at the docks but can't convince anyone else that her cousin is still alive. Eli struggles with Jackie's fervent wish to 'renew' their marriage vows. Eli's foreman at the quarry recognizes the pendant on his necklace, and decides not to lay him off. JB offers Celine a job, and admits he needs her by his side to inspire him in his quest for freedom. Despite her own doubts about the situation, Celine accepts JB's job offer to run the next major event for his luxury liner. JB's backstory is revealed in flashbacks from his childhood, and new tensions arise between JB and his mother.

Week 4

In this week's episodes, Eli's relationship with Jackie is strained further, until a series of events leads Jackie to believe she was unfaithful to Eli. Celine delivers exceptional results at her new job, and wins the grudging praise of Corazon. Eli brings Jackie to Manila, intending to return her to her family, but things don't go as planned. JB and Celine grow closer and JB starts to wonder if he's ready to move on.

Week 5

In this week's episodes, Jackie endears herself to Dadoods and Pong, and makes Eli's birthday very happy. Eli gains his father's blessing to continue deceiving Jackie. Kevin Romero pursues Celine, and demonstrates that he doesn't give up easily. Jackie continues to dream every night, and remembers a little more each time. JB struggles to make sense of his feelings for Celine, and admits to feeling jealous. Jackie and Eli return to the province. Celine decides to fight destiny, only to be disappointed.

Week 6

In this week's episodes, Celine finds the strength to deal with Kevin Romero's blackmail attempt, but Corazon is furious when the Romero account is lost. Jackie continues to remember more of her past, but is determined to focus on her present with Eli. Eli gives Jackie his pendant, and finds a way to buy Jackie a wedding ring. Imelda hints at a past relationship between Corazon and Fidel. When JB and Celine go camping to get away from it all, Celine confesses her love for JB, and he admits to needing her. Celine and Jackie bump into each other at the town market, but Jackie runs away. JB is furious when Corazon shows him photos. Upset, Celine drives too fast and doesn't see an oncoming truck until it's too late. Jackie hits her head and remembers everything when she wakes up. She boards a bus and returns to her father's home, just as Fidel looks out the window and sees her.

Week 7

In this week's episodes, a new chapter begins when Jackie remembers her past and returns to her father's home, with no memory of her time with Eli. Celine is heartbroken, but she tells JB she's willing to wait until he can tell Jackie about them. JB finds himself torn and uncertain about his feelings. Corazon tells JB only he can choose between Jackie and Celine. Eli is hurt when he realizes that Jackie can no longer remember him, although the news is cause for relief for Pong and Dadoods. Jackie surprises everyone with some new habits and preferences. Monique tries to speak to Jackie, but an enraged Fidel warns her to stay away. Eli can't stay away and follows Jackie to her dinner with JB.

Week 8

In this week's episodes, JB continues to be torn between Celine and Jackie, while Celine grows impatient waiting for the right time for Jackie to learn the truth. Eli mourns the loss of his relationship with Jackie, until a visit from his mother in a dream brings him to his senses. Fidel finds it hard to say no when Jackie is determined to build a relationship with her mother, Monique. Instead, he decides to send Jackie to the US to seek treatment for her amnesia, and sends Imelda to warn Monique about attending Jackie's party.

Week 9

In this week's episodes, flashbacks reveal how Celine and JB first met as teenagers one summer, with JB quickly falling for Celine and telling her she's the girl he'll one day marry. But Corazon intervenes and arranges for JB and Jackie to meet. Eli returns to the province to update Mang Simo, and they tell everyone that Jackie had to stay in Manila for work. JB finally remembers his past with Celine and chooses her over Jackie... just as Celine gives up on a relationship with JB and decides to go after the Romero account so she can resign 'with a bang.' Eli tries to prevent a crime and gets stabbed for his trouble. In the process, he meets JB and gets a hospital visit from Jackie, who still does not remember him.

Week 10

Week 11

Week 12

Week 13

Week 14

Week 15

Week 16

Week 17

Week 18

Week 19

Week 20

Week 21

Week 22

Week 23

Week 24

Week 25

Week 26

Week 27

Week 28

Week 29

Week 30

Week 31

Week 32

Week 33

See also
Maging Sino Ka Man

References
Maging Sino Ka Man Official Site
 Maging Sino Ka Man on ABS-CBN Now

Lists of soap opera episodes
Lists of Philippine drama television series episodes